"Hero/Heroine" is the debut single by Boys Like Girls, from their eponymous debut album. The single was originally released in October 2006 along with a music video, but it did not chart in its initial run at radio.

However, following the success of "The Great Escape", the band decided to re-release the song and premiered a new video for it on MTV's TRL in November 2007. The song was certified gold by the RIAA in late January 2009.

Music video
There are two music video versions for the single "Hero/Heroine". In the first video, the band is seen to be performing in a room of some sort, while a robbery at a restaurant is taking place. In the second video, which was released when the single was re-released, Martin is seen walking around Boston with his girlfriend (played by Autumn Holley) and the rest of the band is seen in other scenes. During the end of the video, the band is seen performing in front of fans.

Charts

In popular culture
The song was featured in the Nickelodeon TV film Spectacular!, and also in the reality show A Double Shot at Love. It is also briefly visible playing on a TV screen in the 2009 film The Taking of Pelham 123.

References

External links

2006 songs
2006 debut singles
2007 singles
Boys Like Girls songs
Columbia Records singles
RED Distribution singles
Songs written by Martin Johnson (musician)